The 1978–79 South Alabama Jaguars basketball team represented the University of South Alabama during the 1978–79 NCAA Division I men's basketball season. The Jaguars were led by head coach Cliff Ellis, in the second year as head coach. They played their home games at the Mobile Civic Center, and were members of the Sun Belt Conference. They finished the season 20–7, 10–0 in Sun Belt play to finish in first place. They were upset by Jacksonville in the Sun Belt tournament, but did receive an at-large bid to the 1979 NCAA tournament as the No. 6 seed in the Midwest region. In the second round, the Jaguars lost to Louisville, 69–66.

Roster

Schedule and results

|-
!colspan=9 style=| Regular season

|-
!colspan=9 style=| Sun Belt Conference tournament

|-
!colspan=9 style=| Regular season

|-
!colspan=9 style=| NCAA tournament

References

South Alabama Jaguars men's basketball seasons
South Alabama
South Alabama
1978 in sports in Alabama
1979 in sports in Alabama